Kangaroo Creek Gang was an Australian children's television cartoon series which first screened on the Nine Network in 2002. It was produced by Southern Star Group and was based on a set of reading books created from 1981 that follow the adventures of a group of Australian bush animals. Prior to the television series, the original Kangaroo Creek Gang Cassette Tapes for the read-along books were recorded in the early 1980s in Perth, Western Australia and were voiced by Gregory Ker amongst others. Ker voiced the characters of Kevin Kangaroo, Wal Wombat, Tiddles Tiger Snake, Ranger West and also voiced the narrator for some of the read-along books. Helen Matthews, a well-known jazz singer, was also present for the cassette tape recordings and recorded the songs that were on the tapes.

History
Kangaroo Creek Gang began as a series of books, extending to 40 titles with over one million copies sold around Australia. A comic strip was developed for the children's pages in News Limited's Sunday newspapers in most states of Australia.

The gang featured in a series of multi media packages distributed to primary schools, and were also involved with in-flight children's activity packages for Australian Airlines and Ansett. In 1990-91 the Kangaroo Creek Gang starred in a TV commercial for the State Bank of South Australia now known as Bank SA. The jingle was "saving makes sense is what we say". One of the characters, Kenny Kidna, had his own 30 second 'Goodnight girls and boys' segment at 7.30pm every night in Perth, Western Australia on television channel "NEW-10".

The animated series was first broadcast on television in April 2002 on the Nine Network and aired on Starz Kids & Family for some time. The Kangaroo Creek Gang also appeared in live costume and puppet shows throughout Australia, performing primarily in shopping centres.

Characters
 Kevin Kangaroo: (Voiced by Daniel Wyllie) is the main protagonist of the entire series. He is a kangaroo who likes to pull pranks on people.
 Kristie Koala
 Emily Emu
 Wally Wombat
 Mog, Mange, and Garbo: The feral cats
 Peg Platypus
 Eddie Echidna
 Morrie Magpie
 Paddy Possum
 Connie Kookaburra
 Tiddles Tiger snake
 Kenny Kidna
 Mr. Lizard
 Swizzle the Croc
 The Great Dingo

Character voices
 Daniel Wyllie
 Marta Dusseldorp
 John Leary
 Rebecca Massey
 Akmal Saleh
 Anthony Hayes
 Eliza Logan
 Andrew Crabbe
 Keith Buckley
 Gregory Ker (Cassette Tape recordings for read-along books 1980's)

See also 
 List of Australian television series

References
 imdb

External links
 Kangaroo Creek Gang

Australian children's animated television series
Nine Network original programming
2002 Australian television series debuts
2002 Australian television series endings
2000s Australian animated television series
Television series by Endemol Australia
Australian preschool education television series
Television series about kangaroos and wallabies